Plasmodium draconis is a species of apicomplexan parasite in the family Plasmodiidae.

Like all Plasmodium species P. draconis has both vertebrate and insect hosts. The vertebrate hosts for this parasite are reptiles.

Description 

The parasite was first described by Telford in 1995.

The schizonts produce 4–16 merozoites.

Distribution 

This species is found in the Philippines and Sarawak (Malaysia).

Hosts 

The only known host of this species is the flying lizard Draco volans.

References 

draconis